Meet Milt Jackson is an album by American jazz vibraphonist Milt Jackson featuring performances recorded between 1949 and 1956 and released on the Savoy label.

Reception
The Allmusic review by Jim Todd stated: "This collection is valuable for its three tracks from Jackson's January 1956 collaborations with Lucky Thompson.".

Track listing
All compositions by Milt Jackson except as indicated
 "They Can't Take That Away from Me" (George Gershwin, Ira Gershwin) - 6:39 
 "Soulful" - 7:31 
 "Flamingo" (Ted Grouya, Edmund Anderson) - 3:41 
 "Telefunken Blues" [Take 2] (Kenny Clarke, Ernie Wilkins) - 5:53 
 "I've Lost Your Love" - 3:25 
 "Hearing Bells" - 2:53 
 "Junior" - 2:34 
 "Bluesology" - 2:48 
 "Bubu" - 2:32 
Recorded in New York City on February 23, 1949 (tracks 6-9), in Los Angeles, California on November 1, 1954 (track 5) and in New York City on February 7, 1955 (track 4) and January 5, 1956 (tracks 1-3)

Personnel
Milt Jackson – vibes, piano, vocals
Bill Massey - trumpet (tracks 6-9)
Julius Watkins - French horn (tracks 6-9)
Frank Morgan - alto saxophone (track 5)
Walter Benton (track 5), Billy Mitchell (tracks 6-9), Lucky Thompson (tracks 1-3) - tenor saxophone 
Frank Wess - tenor saxophone, flute (track 4)
Charlie Fowlkes - baritone saxophone (track 4)  
Walter Bishop Jr. (tracks 6-9), Wade Legge (tracks 1-3) - piano
Nelson Boyd (tracks 6-9), Percy Heath (track 5), Eddie Jones (track 4), Wendell Marshall (tracks 1-3) - bass
Kenny Clarke (tracks 1-5), Roy Haynes (tracks 6-9)  – drums
Ernie Wilkins - arranger (track 4)

References 

Savoy Records albums
Milt Jackson albums
1956 albums